David Hammond may refer to:

David Hammond (director) (born 1948), American director and acting teacher
David Hammond (swimmer) (1881–1940), American freestyle swimmer and water polo player
David Hammond (broadcaster) (1928–2008), broadcaster from Northern Ireland
David Hammond (presenter) (born 1995), Irish radio presenter

See also
David Hammons (born 1943), American artist